Chinese Taipei participated in the 2014 Asian Para Games in Incheon, South Korea from 18 – 24 October 2014. Seventy-three athletes competed in 12 sports.

Chinese Taipei won 4 gold medals, 10 silver medals, 24 bronze medals for a total of 38 medals, finishing eighth in total medal count on the medal table.

References

2014 in Taiwanese sport
Nations at the 2014 Asian Para Games
Chinese Taipei at the Asian Para Games